Westlane Secondary School is a Canadian public secondary school located in Niagara Falls, Ontario, Canada. It serves the Lundy's Lane area, and is part of the District School Board of Niagara. , it had 669 students. In the Fraser Institute's Report Card on Ontario's Secondary Schools 2011, the school was ranked 351 out of 727 secondary schools in Ontario with an overall rating of 6.3 out of 10.

Its campus contains a football/rugby and soccer field, along with a baseball diamond. The building includes one full newly renovated gymnasium and a half-gym with multiple changing rooms with showers, a weight room, an elevator, and a 500-seat cafeteria.

Westlane's feeder schools are James Morden Public School, Forestview Public School, Greendale Public School, K.S. Durdan Public School and Orchard Park Public School.

Notable graduates of the school are Grammy-nominated electronic music producer deadmau5 (Joel Thomas Zimmerman) and Jim Martyn, play by play announcer and Canadian Motorsports Hall Of Fame 2021 inductee; (American Lemans Series, IMSA Radio, Canadian Tire Motorsports Park, Sebring International Raceway, IMSA Radio).

Technology Department 
Westlane Technology Education encompasses the total program at all levels from grade nine through grade twelve. Students are exposed to and develop skills in the areas of Communication, Electronics, Electricity, Videography, Integrated Technology, Tech Design, Construction, Manufacturing, and Transportation. Westlane Technology Department

FIRST Robotics 
Team # 1503 is a part of Westlane Secondary School's extra curriculum. Students from grades 9-12 are members of the team. Westlane Robotics

Mock Trial Team 
The Mock Trial team was established in 2004. Students compete in extra-curricular tournaments supervised by the Ontario Bar Association. Students prepare a case as both Crown and Defence counsel. The Westlane Mock Trial Team won the District School Board Mock Trial Tournament in 2006, 2007, and 2008. They have finished in the semi-finals or better that the South-Central Ontario Regional Tournament since 2006.

Athletics 
The Westlane Spartans are known for their excellent athletic programs, most notably their basketball, football, rugby, volleyball, and soccer teams. They have produced several OFSAA and SOSSA champions in rugby, basketball, downhill skiing, soccer and cross-country. Westlane Athletics

Men's Football 
The Westlane Spartans are currently members of Niagara Varsity Division 1. This league consists of twelve teams. In 2008, the Spartans record was 6-2. Although the program is currently on the rise, Westlane was a dominant football team in the 1990s. Westlane football were league champions in 1989, 1992, 1993, 1994, 1997, and 2019. Spartan Football Website

Men's Rugby 
The Westlane Spartans Sr. won SOSSA AAA/AAAA in rugby 1998 and Jr. won SOSSA in 1994 and 2004. From the esteemed rugby alumni comes Ray Barkwill Canadian Rugby player.

David Langhorne Fitness Centre 
The fitness centre at Westlane is open to the student population, along with the Physical Education Department. The Fitness centre was constructed, designed and funded by the staff at Westlane, most notably Mr. M. Mancuso, who is currently the Director of Phys. Ed.Langhorne Photo Gallery

See also
List of high schools in Ontario

References

External links 

High schools in the Regional Municipality of Niagara
Buildings and structures in Niagara Falls, Ontario
1960 establishments in Ontario
Educational institutions established in 1960